Moldava nad Bodvou is a town and municipality in Košice-okolie District in the Košice Region of eastern Slovakia.

History
In historical records the town was first mentioned in 1255.

Geography
It has a population of about 11,000 people.

Demographics
According to the 2011 census, the town had 11,086 inhabitants. 45% of inhabitants were Slovaks, 40% Hungarians, and 15% Roma. The religious make-up was 73.61% Roman Catholics, 6.91% people with no religious affiliation, 3.42% Greek Catholics and 1.12% Lutherans.

Economy
The town has a police force and fire service and its own tax office.

Twin towns — sister cities

Moldava nad Bodvou is twinned with:

 Brzozów, Poland
 Cristuru Secuiesc, Romania
 Edelény, Hungary
 Encs, Hungary
 Karcag, Hungary
 Pestszentlőrinc-Pestszentimre, Hungary
 Siklós, Hungary
 Tarcal, Hungary
 Tišnov, Czech Republic

References

External links
 Official website

Cities and towns in Slovakia
Villages and municipalities in Košice-okolie District
Hungarian communities in Slovakia